George Oliver Challinor (November 21, 1874 – July 12, 1956) was an American football coach and dentist. He served as the head football coach at Carnegie Technical Schools—now known as Carnegie Mellon University—in Pittsburgh, Pennsylvania in 1906, compiling a record of 2–3–2. Challinor was an 1897 graduate of Washington & Jefferson College.

Head coaching record

References

External links
 

1870s births
1956 deaths
American dentists
Carnegie Mellon Tartans football coaches
Washington & Jefferson College alumni